Heliocheilus pallida is a moth in the family Noctuidae. It is found in the Australian Capital Territory, New South Wales, the Northern Territory, Queensland, South Australia and Western Australia.

Larvae have been recorded feeding on the seedheads of Dichantium tenuiculum.

External links
Australian Caterpillars
pallida Australian Faunal Directory

Heliocheilus
Moths of Australia